Yasaka may refer to:
 Yasaka, Nagano, Japan (dissolved village)
 Yasaka, Shimane, Japan (dissolved village)
 Yasaka, Kyoto, Japan (dissolved town)
 Yasaka Shrine in Kyoto, Japan
 Yasaka Station (Tokyo), a station on the Seibu Tamako Line in Higashimurayama, Tokyo, Japan
 Yasaka Station (Gifu), a station on the Etsumi-Nan Line in Gujō, Gifu, Japan
 Yasaka (corporation), a sporting goods equipment maker
 Yaska, a 6th-century B.C. Sanskrit grammarian